The 2021–22 season was the Bashundhara Kings's 9th competitive professional season since its creation in 2013, and 4th consecutive season in Bangladesh Premier League, country's top tier football league. In addition to domestic league, Bashundhara Kings was participated on this season's edition of AFC Cup, Federation Cup and Independence Cup. This season were covered from 1 October 2021 to 30 July 2022.

Season overview

November
On 30 November Bashundhara Kings has faced Bangladesh Navy football team and thrashed them by 6–0 goals. Stojan Vranješ scored two goals and  Fernandes,
Robinho Eleta Kingsley one of each a own goal by Habibur Bangladesh Navy.

December
On 4 December Bashundhara Kings defeated Bangladesh Police FC by 1–0 goal. Winning penalty goal on 16 minutes by 
Robinho
secured the club victory. As a result of this match they have qualified to the knockout stage even though one match remaining.

On 8 December Bashudhara Kings defeated by 3–0 goals Chittagong Abahani. Brazilian forward Robinho
on 17 minutes took lead and finished first half. In the second half on 83 minutes goal by Mohammad Ibrahim made scored 2–0 and Motin Mia made it in the 87 minutes 3–0. Bashundhara Kings qualified to the Knockout stage as group champion of 2021–22 Independence Cup (Bangladesh).

On 12 December Bashundhara Kings have beaten 4–0 goals Sheikh Jamal DC. First half both teams played goalless both are played well but their players wouldn't found net. In the second half on 58 minutes Motin Mia open account & Brazilian forward Fernandez two goals on 73, 81 make 3–0. In the additional time 94 minutes Alamgir Kabir Rana made it 4–0. As a result of this match Bashundhara Kings qualified to the Semi-finals.

On 14 December Bashundha Kings defeated Bangladesh Police FC by 2–1 goals. In the 8 minutes Danilo Quipapá scored for Police FC but they couldn't hold it for long. In the 30 minutes Mohammad Ibrahim made it 1–1. In the second half both teams were goalless. End of full time in the extra 30 minutes 119 minutes Yeasin Arafat secured Bashundhara Kings final.

On 18 December Bashundhara Kings lost to Dhaka Abahani by 0–3 goals. Both teams played first half goalless but in the 53rd minute a Rakib Hossain goal took the lead for Dhaka Abahnai. Two more goals scored by Brazilian forward Dorielton on 63 and 72 minutes ensured  Dhaka Abahani trophy. Rest of the second half Kings players didn't found any goal.

On 25 December 2021 Bashundhara Kings lost 3–0 by Walkover laws against Swadhinata KS. The match were scheduled to play Versus Swadhinata KS but Kings withdrew their name from the tournament.

On 29 December 2021 Bashundhara Kings lost 3–0 by Walkover laws against Dhaka Mohammedan. The match were scheduled to play Versus Dhaka Mohammedan KS but Kings withdrew their name from the tournament. The match commissioner awarded Dhaka Mohammedan winner of the match.

February
On 3 February Bashundhara Kings played their home game versus Swadhinata KS and defeated by 1–2 goals. On 25 minutes Nedo Turković penalty goal took lead and on 45+1 minutes goal by Rasel Ahmed made the score 2–0 and go to half time. In the second half time goal on 73 minutes by Tawhidul Alam Sabuz made score 1–2 but Bashundhara Kings players couldn't found the net to score any goals to avoid the loss of the match.

On 7 February Bashundhara Kings won their away match by 1–0 against Uttar Baridhara Club. In  the first on  26 minutes a goal by Bosnian forward  Stojan Vranješ took the lead Bashundhara Kings till ended of first half. In the second half both team played excellent football but Uttar Baridhara players wouldn't able to score a goal versus Bashundhara Kings. Till the last whistle Bashundhara Kings hold 1–0 goal lead and left the field with 3 points.

On 12 February Bashundhara Kings defeated Muktijoddha Sangsad KC by 1–0 at home. First half both teams played excellent football and finished by 0–0 score. In the second half on 58 minutes Brazilian forward Robson goal took lead Kings and they have finished it 1–0. Muktijoddha SKC players tried to play attacking football but it wasn't not enough to equalized score.

On 17 February Bashundhara Kings defeated 3–0 goals Bangladesh Police FC at home game. In the first halftime both teams played excellent football but no teams has score any goals. In the second half on 66 minutes a goal by Robinho Bashudhara Kings took lead. On 77 minutes penalty goal by Robinho lead the score 2–0. On 82 minutes Police FC Md Eshanur Rahman showed red card and sent off him. On 87 minutes a goal by Eleta Kingsley made scoreline 3–0 and Bashundhara Kings got full three points.

On 22 February Bashundhara Kings won by 3–2 goals against Rahmatganj MFS. In the first half Rahmatganj MFS Nigerian forward Sunday Chizoba goal on 28 minutes took the lead Rahmatganj MFS but between 4 minutes Brazilian Robinho equalized scored 1–1. On 44 minutes Mohammed Ibrahim goal gave lead to Basundhara Kings made score 2–1. In the last minutes of half time second penalty goal by Sunday Chizoba on 45+3 minutes finished halftime with 2–2. In the second half on 75 minutes Yeasin Khan goal secured victory for Bashundhara Kings  3–2.

On 28 February Bashundhara Kings have won by 1–0 goal against Sheikh Russel KC in the away match. In the first half both teams has play competitive football and they have finished 0–0 score first half of the match. In the second part of the match on 83 minutes a penalty goal by Brazilian star Robson goal gave victory for Bashundhara Kings by 1–0 and they have climb on table topper.

March
On 5 March Bashundhara Kings defeated by 2–0 goals Dhaka Mohammedan at home ground. In the first half on 11 minutes a goal by Sumon Reza and on 19 minutes Brazilian forward Robson Bashundhara Kings made score 2–0 and they have ended first half with leading score 2–0. In the second half on 47 minutes Anik Hossain Dhaka Mohammedan sent off due to bad gesture and foul. Rest of the game Dhaka Mohammedan haven't able to come back in the match and Bashundhara Kings finished the match with 2–0 win.

On 11 March Bashundhara Kings won by 5–0 goals against Chittagong Abahani at home ground.

On 16 March Bashundhara Kings defeated Saif Sporting Club by 4–3 goals at home ground.

April
On 3 April Bashundhara Kings drew against Dhaka Abahani by 2–2 at in the away game. On 20 minutes Costarican forward Daniel Colindres goal got lead Dhaka Abahani 1–0 goal, meanwhile Bashundhara Kings players did not found the net in the first half. In the second half on 64 minutes Eleta Kingsley and Brazilian forward Robson goals got 2–1 goals advantage Bashundhara Kings but on 84 minutes Dorielton goal equalized score 2–2 goals both giants teams satisfied with share points.

On 7 April Bashundhara Kings drew by 3–3 goals against Sheikh Jamal DC at home ground.

On 24 April Bashudhara Kings have defeated by 2–0 goals Swadhinata KS in their away game. In the first half debutant Brazilian forward Miguel Figueira two goals on 28 and 35 minutes got lead Bashundhara Kings and finished half time. In the last 45 minutes both teams play defensive football and Bashundhara Kings took their very first game revenge against Swadhinata KS.

On 28 April Bashundhara Kings have beat Uttar Baridhara Club by 6–0 goals at the home ground.

May
On 7 May Bashundhara Kings have won over Muktijoddha Sangsad KC by 3–2 in the away game.

On 12 May Bashudhara Kings won versus Bangladesh Police FC by 2–1 goals in the away match.

On 18 May Bashundhara Kings have won versus Maldivian club Maziya S&RC by 1–0 goal in the first group stages match of AFC Cup.

On 21 May Bashundhara Kings have lost against Indian club ATK Mohun Bagan by 0–4 goals in the second match of the group stages of AFC Cup.

On 24 May Bashundhara Kings have got victory versus Indian club Gokulam Kerala by 2–1 goals in their third and last game of group stage 2022 AFC Cup.

June
On 21 June Bashundhara Kings have won against Rahmatganj MFS by 2–0 in the away game.

On 26 June Bashundhara Kings have won against Sheikh Russel KC by 3–2 goals at home ground.

July
On 2 July Bashundhara Kings have drew versus Dhaka Mohammedan by 1–1 in the away game.

On 7 July Bashunhara Kings have got victory versus Chittagong Abahani by 1–0 goals in the opponent ground.

On 18 July Bashundhara Kings have won against Saif Sporting Club by 2–0 goals in the away game.

On 25 July Bashundhara Kings have won by 3–2 goals versus Dhaka Abahani at home ground.

On 30 July Bashundhara Kings have won by 1–2 goals versus Sheikh Jamal DC in the away game.

Players

Pre-season friendly

Transfer

In

Out

Loans Out

Released

Competitions

Overall

Overview

Independence Cup

Group stages

Group D

Knockout stage

Federation Cup

Group stages

Group A

Premier League

League table

Results summary

Results by round

Matches

AFC Cup

Group stage

Group D

Statistics

Goalscorers

Source: Matches

References

Bashundhara Kings
Bangladeshi football club records and statistics
Football clubs in Bangladesh
2022 in Bangladeshi football
2021 in Bangladeshi football